Burrland Farm Historic District is a historic home and farm complex and national historic district located near Middleburg, Fauquier County, Virginia. The district encompasses 22 contributing buildings, 2 contributing sites, 14 contributing structures, and 1 contributing object on a 458-acre thoroughbred horse breeding and training farm.  The buildings were built between 1927 and 1932, and include a Georgian Revival style training barn, a polo barn, a stallion barn, two broodmare barns, a yearling barn, a field shed, an equipment shed, a farm manager's house / office, a trainer's cottage, a mess hall quarters, a foreman's dwelling, three mash houses, five garages, a pumphouse, and a feed and storage warehouse. The contributing structures include a silo, a springhouse, three loading chutes, two teasing chutes, two rings, three run-in sheds, one sun hut and an entrance gate. The original Burrland house was built in 1879 and expanded in 1927 for William Ziegler Jr. by architect William Lawrence Bottomley. Ziegler sold the property in 1955 to Eleonora Sears, who "deliberately gutted and burned [the mansion] down" in 1961. She then sold the farm in 1966.

It was listed on the National Register of Historic Places in 1997.

References

Historic districts in Fauquier County, Virginia
Farms on the National Register of Historic Places in Virginia
Georgian Revival architecture in Virginia
Buildings and structures completed in 1932
National Register of Historic Places in Fauquier County, Virginia
Historic districts on the National Register of Historic Places in Virginia